João Manuel Antunes Dias (born 23 December 1986) is a Portuguese former professional footballer who played as a right-back.

Club career
Born in Braga, Dias played youth football with local S.C. Braga as well as FC Porto. He made his senior debut with the latter's B team, which competed in the third division. In the summer of 2006, he signed for Italian amateurs A.C. Prato.

Dias first appeared at the professional level in 2008–09, with C.D. Santa Clara. He scored his first goal for the Azores side the following season when he contributed to a 2–1 home win against Varzim SC, and in June 2010 he joined fellow Segunda Liga club C.D. Trofense on a one-year contract.

In June 2011, Dias agreed to a two-year deal at Académica de Coimbra. His maiden appearance in the Primeira Liga took place on 15 August, when he played the full 90 minutes of the 2–1 away victory over U.D. Leiria. During his spell at the Estádio Cidade de Coimbra, however, he was sparingly used.

In 2015, after one top-flight campaign with Boavista FC, Dias returned to both Santa Clara and the second tier.

Honours
Académica
Taça de Portugal: 2011–12

Portugal Under-17
UEFA European Under-17 Championship: 2003

References

External links

1986 births
Living people
Sportspeople from Braga
Portuguese footballers
Association football defenders
Primeira Liga players
Liga Portugal 2 players
Segunda Divisão players
FC Porto B players
C.D. Santa Clara players
C.D. Trofense players
Associação Académica de Coimbra – O.A.F. players
Boavista F.C. players
S.C. Covilhã players
U.D. Leiria players
A.C. Prato players
Portugal youth international footballers
Portuguese expatriate footballers
Expatriate footballers in Italy
Portuguese expatriate sportspeople in Italy